List of castles in North America may refer to:

List of castles in Canada
List of castles in the United States
List of castles in Mexico

Castles in North America